GTA may refer to:

Arts and entertainment 
 Grand Theft Auto, series of video games by Rockstar Games
 Grand Theft Auto (video game), the original 1997 game
 Grand Theft Auto Advance, also known simply as Grand Theft Auto, 2004
 Grand Theft Auto (film), a 1977 film directed by Ron Howard
 Grand Text Auto, a game studies blog by Nick Montfort
 Good Times Ahead (GTA), an American electronic music duo

Vehicles

Alfa Romeo
 Alfa Romeo GTA, a succession of Italian sport coupés (1965–1975) based on the Giulia
 147 GTA, a high-performance version of the Alfa Romeo 147
 156 GTA, a high-performance version of the Alfa Romeo 156
 MiTo GTA, a concept version of the Alfa Romeo MiTo

Other uses
 Grand theft auto, a type of crime, see motor vehicle theft
 GTA Motor, a Spanish automobile designer and manufacturer
 GTA Motor Competición, a Spanish racing team
 Pontiac Firebird Trans Am GTA, a U.S. sport coupé (1987–1992)
 Renault Alpine GTA/A610, a French sport coupé (1986–1991)
 Renault GTA, a sub-compact by American Motors (1986–1987) based on the Renault Alliance

Places 
 Goleta station, California, U.S. (station code: GTA)
 Gorkhaland Territorial Administration, semi-autonomous region in India
 Grande Traversée des Alpes, a hiking trail in France
 Grande Traversata delle Alpi, a hiking trail in Italy
 Great Ayton railway station, England (station code: GTA)
 Greater Toronto Area, metropolitan area in Southern Ontario, Canada

Science and technology 
 Gas tungsten arc welding
 Gene transfer agent, a DNA-containing particle produced by some bacteria
 Global Technology Associates, an Internet firewall maker
 GTA, a codon for the amino acid valine
 GTA Teleguam, a telecommunications company in Guam

Other uses 
Gerakan Tanah Air, a Malaysian coalition.
 Golden Ticket Awards, an award ceremony for theme parks
 Graduate teaching assistant
 Grow the Army, a transformation and restationing initiative of the United States Army
 Guató language, spoken in Brazil
 Gynecological teaching associate, in medical education. See Simulated patient#Uses